Lorence Gene "Larry" Collins (born November 19, 1931, in Vernon, Kansas) is an American petrologist, known for his opposition to creationist geological pseudo-science.

Career 
Collins is a professor emeritus of geological sciences at California State University, Northridge. He studied geology at the University of Illinois at Urbana–Champaign, where he earned a bachelor's degree in 1953, a master's degree in 1955, and a Ph.D. in 1959. He joined the faculty of San Fernando Valley State College, which later became CSU Northridge, in 1959.

Personal life 
Collins was married to the noted biologist Barbara J. Collins until her death in 2013.  Together they had five children.

References

External links 
 Homepage

American geologists
California State University, Northridge faculty
University of Illinois Urbana-Champaign alumni
1931 births
Living people